The WCF Hall of Fame is an international curling Hall of Fame that was established by the World Curling Federation (WCF) in 2012. The induction is given as an honor that recognizes outstanding contributions to the sport of curling, and is awarded annually. Inductees are also awarded the World Curling Freytag Award, an award which predated the WCF Hall of Fame as the highest honor given by the WCF. Previous Freytag Award winners have been inducted into the WCF Hall of Fame.

Inductees in the WCF Hall of Fame are curlers or builders of the sport of curling; curlers are inducted based on their performance results, ability, sportsmanship, and character, while builders are inducted based on their distinguished service and major contributions to the development of the sport of curling.

Inductees
The inductees are listed as follows:

Notes

References

External links
World Curling Hall of Fame

Curling trophies and awards
Sports halls of fame
World Curling Federation